The Feathered Serpent was a prominent supernatural entity or deity, found in many Mesoamerican religions. It is still called Quetzalcoatl among the Aztecs, Kukulkan among the Yucatec Maya, and Q'uq'umatz and Tohil among the K'iche' Maya.

The double symbolism used by the Feathered Serpent is considered allegoric to the dual nature of the deity, where being feathered represents its divine nature or ability to fly to reach the skies and being a serpent represents its human nature or ability to creep on the ground among other animals of the Earth, a dualism very common in Mesoamerican deities.

Description
The earliest representations of feathered serpents appear in the Olmec culture ( 1400–400 BC). The Olmec culture predates the Maya and the Aztec. This cultural enclave extended from the Gulf of Mexico to Nicaragua. Most surviving representations in Olmec art, such as Monument 19 at La Venta, and a painting in the Juxtlahuaca cave (see below), show the Feathered Serpent as a crested rattlesnake, sometimes with feathers covering the body and legs, and often in close proximity to humans. It is believed that Olmec supernatural entities such as the feathered serpent were the forerunners of many later Mesoamerican deities, although experts disagree on the feathered serpent's religious importance to the Olmec. H.B. Nicholson notes that as early as the Middle Formative (Preclassic) in the Olmec tradition, images of serpents with avian characteristics were often represented in several types of artifacts and monuments. This composite creature, who has been denominated the “Avian Serpent” and “Olmec God VII,” appears to constitute an earlier form of the later full-fledged Feathered Serpent, the rattlesnake covered with feathers, probably with at least some of the same celestial and fertility connotations.

The pantheon of the people of Teotihuacan (200 BC – 700 AD) also featured a feathered serpent, shown most prominently on the Temple of the Feathered Serpent (dated 150–200 AD). The pyramid was built southeast of the intersection of the avenue of the dead and the east-end avenue. Several feathered serpent representations appear on the building, many of them including full-body profiles and feathered serpent heads. The sculptures utilize practices such as relief carving to create complex ornate compositions. Head carvings of the Feathered Serpent have been frequently found around the Pyramid of the Feathered Serpent.

While the feathered serpent has been a common theme in different Mesoamerican works, it is frequently and most commonly reflected in the architecture of Mesoamerican culture. Some common techniques used to incorporate imagery of the Feathered Serpent into this architecture is relief carving, which involves “a sculpture with figures that protrude from a background while still being attached to it” and normally combined with tenoned heads, which are large pieces of stone carved but have a peg of sorts to insert them into the wall area, adding more depth and details to the architecture. Other Mesoamerican structures, such as the ones in Tula, the capital of the later Toltecs (950–1150 AD), also featured profiles of feathered serpents.

The Aztec feathered serpent deity known as Quetzalcoatl is known from several Aztec codices, such as the Florentine codex, as well as from the records of the Spanish conquistadors. Quetzalcoatl was known as the deity of wind and rain, bringer of knowledge, the inventor of books, and associated with the planet Venus.

The corresponding Mayan god Kukulkan was rare in the Classic era Maya civilization. However, in the Popol Vuh, the K'iche' feathered serpent god Tepeu Q'uq'umatz is the creator of the cosmos.

Along with the feathered serpent deity, several other serpent gods existed in the pantheon of Mesoamerican gods with similar traits, all of which had an important role in the cultural development of Mesoamerican cultures. The evidence of the importance of these deities to Mesoamerican culture lies in the architecture left from these civilizations and the rituals surrounding them.

See also
Awanyu
Horned Serpent
Serpent (symbolism)
Xiuhcoatl
Amaru (mythology)

Notes

References

 "Marvels of Ancient Mexico" (2018). Blouin Art + Auction, 41(6), 145–146.
 
 
 
  
 Joralemon, Peter David (1996) "In Search of the Olmec Cosmos: Reconstructing the World View of Mexico's First Civilization", in Olmec Art of Ancient Mexico, eds. E. P. Benson and B. de la Fuente, National Gallery of Art, Washington D.C., pp. 51–60.
7
  
 Nicholson, H. B. "Feathered Serpent." In David Carrasco (ed).The Oxford Encyclopedia of Mesoamerican Cultures. : Oxford University Press, 2001
 Taube, Karl A. "The Teotihuacan Cave of Origin: The Iconography and Architecture of Emergence Mythology in Mesoamerica and the American Southwest", Res: Anthropology and aesthetics 12 (Autumn 1986): 51-82.

Further reading
Bardawil, Lawrence W. “The Principal Bird Deity in Maya Art—An Iconographic Study of Form and Meaning.” In The Art, Iconography and Dynastic History of Palenque, part 3: Proceedings of the Segunda Mesa Redonda de Palenque, December 14–21, 1974—Palenque, edited by Merle Green Robertson, pp. 195–209. Pebble Beach, Calif., 1976. Well-illustrated survey and discussion of the Classic Maya icon that appears to have been conceptually related to the Feathered Serpent.

Berrin, Kathleen ed., Feathered Serpent and Flowering Trees: Reconstructing the Murals of Teotihuacan. San Francisco, 1988. Articles describing and interpreting a large corpus of murals donated in 1976 to the M. H. de Young Memorial Museum, San Francisco, which include some striking images of the Feathered Serpent.
Joralemon, Peter David. A Study of Olmec Iconography. Dumbarton Oaks, Trustees for Harvard University, Studies in Pre-Columbian Art and Archaeology, 7. Washington, D.C., 1971. Survey and analysis of Olmec iconography, in which the author identifies what he calls “God VII” as the Feathered Serpent.
López Austin, Alfredo, Leonardo López Luján, and Saburo Sugiyama. “The Temple of Quetzalcoatl at Teotihuacan: Its Possible Significance.” Ancient Mesoamerica 2.1 (1991), 93–106. Following an analysis of the iconography of the structure, the conclusion is that it was dedicated to “the myth of the origin of time and calendric succession,” with the sculptures on its façade representing “the Feathered Serpent at the moment of creation.”
Miller, Arthur. The Moral Painting of Teotihuacan. Washington, D.C., 1973. Comprehensive survey and discussion of Teotihuacan murals at time of publication, including some that feature the Feathered Serpent.
Nicholson, H. B. “The ‘Feathered Serpents’ of Copan.” In The Periphery of the Southeastern Classic Maya Realm, edited by Gary W. Pahl, pp. 171–188. UCLA Latin American Center Publications, 61. Los Angeles, 1987. Discussion of four Classic Copán monuments with images that had been identified by various students as Feathered Serpents; the conclusion, after a review of Mesoamerican ophidian iconography, was that as versions of the “Bearded Dragon,” they represent an essentially distinct entity.
Nicholson, H. B. “The Iconography of the Feathered Serpent in Late Postclassic Central Mexico.” In Mesoamerica's Classic Heritage: From Teotihuacan to the Aztecs, edited by Davíd Carrasco, Lindsay Jones, and Scott Sessions, pp. 145–164. Boulder, Colo., 2000. Illustrated survey and discussion of Feathered Serpent iconography in this period and area, emphasizing its richness and diversity.
Ringle, William M., Tomás Gallareta Negrón, and George J. Bey. “The Return of Quetzalcoatl: Evidence for the Spread of a World Religion during the Epiclassic Period.” Ancient Mesoamerica 9.2 (1998), 183–232. After a broad survey of the archaeological evidence, the authors advance the hypothesis that the militaristic spread of an organized Quetzalcoatl millenarian religion best explains the wide distribution of Feathered Serpent symbolism during the Mesoamerican Epiclassic.
Sugiyama, Saburo. “Teotihuacan as an Origin for Postclassic Feathered Serpent Symbolism.” In Mesoamerica's Classic Heritage: From Teotihuacan to the Aztecs, edited by Davíd Carrasco, Lindsay Jones, and Scott Sessions, pp. 117–143. Boulder, Colo., 2000. Surveys the Feather Serpent imagery at Teotihuacan and develops the identification of the head alternating with the Feathered Serpent head on the tableros of the Pyramid of the Feathered Serpent as the headdress of the “Primordial Crocodile.”
Taube, Karl A. “The Temple of Quetzalcoatl and the Cult of Sacred War at Teotihuacan.” Res 21 (1992), 54–87. Identifies the head that alternates with the Feathered Serpent on the tableros of the Pyramid of the Feathered Serpent as a headdress imaging the “War Serpent,” a solar fire serpent ancestral to the Postclassic Xiuhcoatl, that was also widely adopted by Classic Maya rulers, with the structure itself, featuring Feathered Serpent heads emerging from mirrors, apparently an ancestral form of the Tezcacoac, “Place of the Mirror Snake,” an Aztec temple connected with war.
Taube, Karl A. “The Rainmakers: The Olmec and Their Contribution to Mesoamerican Belief and Ritual.” In The Olmec World: Ritual and Rulership, pp. 83–103. Princeton, N.J., 1998. Discussion with numerous illustrations of the “Avian Serpent” in Olmec iconography—the apparent prototype of the rattlesnake covered with feathers that constituted the later Mesoamerican Feathered Serpent.

External links 
 

 
Indigenous Mesoamerican legendary creatures
Mesoamerican stone sculpture
Quetzalcoatl